Richard Knollys (c. 1548–1596) was an English Member of Parliament.

Life
He was the 5th son of Sir Francis Knollys and the brother of Edward, Francis, Robert, William and Henry Knollys, who were all MPs. He entered the Middle Temple in 1571.

He was a Member (MP) of the Parliament of England for Wallingford in 1584 and 1586, and for Northampton in 1589.

He married Joan, the daughter of John Heigham of Gifford, Suffolk and had 3 sons and 2 daughters. His second son, Robert, was also an MP.

Ancestry

References

1540s births
1596 deaths
Members of the Middle Temple
English MPs 1584–1585
English MPs 1586–1587
English MPs 1589